Kevin Michael Nisbet  (born 8 March 1997) is a Scottish professional footballer who plays as a centre-forward for Scottish Premiership club Hibernian and the Scotland national team. He has previously played for Partick Thistle, Raith Rovers and Dunfermline Athletic, as well as East Stirlingshire, Ayr United and Dumbarton on loan.

Career

Partick Thistle and loans
Nisbet was raised in Cambuslang, South Lanarkshire, and attended Trinity High School. He played for Hibernian's under-15 team before joining the Partick Thistle youth system. He joined the club as a full-time apprentice in summer 2014. 

Having quickly progressed through the Thistle Weir Academy, he made his breakthrough in the Firhill side's development squad. He made 18 appearances at that level during the 2014–15 campaign, and scored six goals, including a hat-trick against Falkirk.

Nisbet joined Scottish League Two side East Stirlingshire on loan in February 2015, making 11 appearances and scoring six goals in his time at Ochilview Park. He returned to Partick Thistle and made his first-team debut for the club on 19 September 2015 as a substitute in a 1–0 defeat away to Ross County in the Scottish Premiership.

Nisbet joined Ayr United on loan at the start of the 2016–17 season, on a six-month deal running until 14 January 2017. He later joined Dumbarton on loan in January 2018.

Partick were relegated to the Scottish Championship via the play-offs at the end of the 2017–18 season, following which Nisbet was one of many players released by the club.

Raith and Dunfermline
Nisbet signed for Scottish League One side Raith Rovers in July 2018. He finished the season at Raith Rovers with 35 goals in all competitions.

Nisbet then signed for local rivals Dunfermline Athletic in June 2019, scoring 20 goals in all competitions before the end of 2019. During the January 2020 transfer window, a number of clubs - including his future employers Hibernian - were said to be interested in the player's signature, however, Dunfermline opted to reject all bids for Nisbet with the intention of keeping him until at least the summer. Nisbet finished the curtailed 2019–20 season having scored 23 goals in 32 appearances.

Hibernian
After attracting interest from several clubs, Nisbet signed a four-year contract with Scottish Premiership side Hibernian on 10 July 2020 for an undisclosed fee. During the January 2021 transfer window Hibs rejected offers for Nisbet from EFL Championship club Birmingham City. Nisbet finished the 2020–21 season as Hibs’ top scorer scoring 18 goals in 45 games in all domestic competitions.

On 22 July 2021, Nisbet scored his first goal in a European club tournament in Hibs’ 3–0 win over Andorran side FC Santa Coloma. He suffered a knee injury in February 2022 that required surgery, and is expected to prevent him from playing for several months.

Nisbet returned to first-team training in November 2022, and scored in his first league appearance back, a 3–2 defeat at Rangers on 15 December. He scored a hat-trick in a 3–2 win at Motherwell on 8 January, which helped him win a Premiership player of the month award. Hibs accepted an offer of around £2 million from EFL Championship club Millwall during the January 2023 transfer window, but Nisbet decided against the proposed move.

International career 
On 16 March 2021, Nisbet received his first Scotland call-up ahead of 2022 World Cup qualifiers against Austria, Israel and Faroe Islands. Nisbet made his international debut on 31 March, appearing as a substitute in a 4–0 win against the Faroe Islands. He was one of three strikers selected in the Scotland squad for the delayed UEFA Euro 2020 tournament, and scored his first international goal in a pre-tournament friendly against the Netherlands. Nisbet appeared as a substitute in each of Scotland's three matches at the Euro 2020 finals.

Career statistics

Club

International

''As of match played 7 September 2021. Scotland score listed first, score column indicates score after each Nisbet goal.

References

1997 births
Living people
Sportspeople from Cambuslang
Footballers from Glasgow
Scottish footballers
Association football forwards
Partick Thistle F.C. players
East Stirlingshire F.C. players
Ayr United F.C. players
Dumbarton F.C. players
Raith Rovers F.C. players
Dunfermline Athletic F.C. players
Hibernian F.C. players
Scottish Professional Football League players
Scotland international footballers
UEFA Euro 2020 players
People educated at Trinity High School, Rutherglen
Footballers from South Lanarkshire